Road Tested is a live album and first live album by Bonnie Raitt, released in 1995.

Track listing
CD One
"Thing Called Love" (John Hiatt) – 4:48
"Three Time Loser" (Don Covay, Ronald Dean Miller) – 3:39
"Love Letter" (Bonnie Hayes) – 4:37
"Never Make Your Move Too Soon" (Stix Hooper, Will Jennings) – 3:32
"Something to Talk About" (Shirley Eikhard) – 3:43
"Matters of the Heart" (Michael McDonald) – 4:58
"Shake a Little" (Michael Ruff) – 4:38
"Have a Heart" (Bonnie Hayes) – 5:45
"Love Me Like a Man" (Chris Smither) – 5:11
"The Kokomo Medley" (Mississippi Fred McDowell) – 4:59
"Louise" (Paul Siebel) – 3:46
"Dimming of the Day" (Richard Thompson)  – 4:19
CD Two
"Longing in Their Hearts" (Bonnie Raitt, Michael O'Keefe)  – 5:02
"Come to Me" (Raitt) – 5:02
"Love Sneakin' Up On You" (Jimmy Scott, Tom Snow) – 3:52
"Burning Down the House" (David Byrne, Chris Frantz, Jerry Harrison, Tina Weymouth) – 4:21
"I Can't Make You Love Me" (Mike Reid, James Allen Shamblin)   – 6:00
"Feeling of Falling" (Raitt) – 6:45
"I Believe I'm in Love with You" (Kim Wilson) (with Kim Wilson)– 5:24
"Rock Steady" (Bryan Adams, Gretchen Peters)  – 4:12
"My Opening Farewell" (Jackson Browne)  – 4:57
"Angel from Montgomery" (John Prine)  – 5:37

Personnel 
 Bonnie Raitt – vocals, slide guitar, acoustic guitar, keyboards (18)

Band
 Glen Clark – keyboards, harmonica, vocals, harmony vocals (13)
 Mark T. Jordan – keyboards, vocals, mandolin (5), harmony vocals (12)
 Benmont Tench – Hammond B3 organ
 Jamie Muhoberac – additional keyboards (15)
 Marty Grebb – acoustic piano (19)
 George Marinelli – acoustic guitar, electric guitar, vocals, mandolin (11)
 Keith Scott – tremolo guitar (20)
 James "Hutch" Hutchinson – bass guitar, vocals
 Ricky Fataar – drums
 Debra Dobkin – percussion, vocals

Guests
 Bruce Hornsby – accordion (1, 22), vocals (1, 22), acoustic piano (17)
 Charles Brown – acoustic piano (4), vocals (4)
 Ruth Brown – vocals (4)
 Kim Wilson – harmonica (4, 19), vocals (19, 22)
 Bryan Adams – guitar (20), vocals (20, 22)
 Jackson Browne – guitar (21), vocals (21, 22)

Production 
 Bonnie Raitt – producer
 Don Was – producer 
 Ed Cherney – recording, mixing (1-19, 21, 22)
 Bob Clearmountain – mixing (20)
 Dan Bosworth – additional engineer
 Steve Beatty – recording assistant 
 Phil Gitomer – recording assistant 
 David Hewitt – recording assistant 
 Sean McClintock – recording assistant 
 Tom Banghart – mix assistant (1-19, 21, 22)
 Recorded live using Remote Recording Services' Silver Truck
 Chomsky Ranch (Los Angeles, California) – engineering location 
 Brooklyn Recording Studio (Los Angeles, California) – mixing location 
 Doug Sax – mastering at The Mastering Lab (Hollywood, California)
 Norman Moore – art direction, design, artwork 
 Tommy Steele – art direction 
 Jennifer George – design 
 Lorraine Day – cover photography,  additional photography
 Ken Friedman – additional photography
 Jeffrey Hersh – management
 Ron Stone – management 

Stage and Tour Crew
 Robert Bennett – tour manager 
 Lisa Van Valkenburgh – assistant tour manager 
 Dan Cook – stage manager 
 Doug Gherna – monitor engineer 
 Paul Middleton – house sound engineer 
 Peter Kudas – audio systems engineer 
 John Tanasi – audio systems engineer 
 Terry Lawless – keyboard technician
 John Gonzales – guitar technician
 John Cregar – drum technician
 John Cormier – lighting director
 Tom Thompson – lighting technician
 Mike Wheeler – lighting technician

Charts
Album 

Album (Year-end)

Singles - Billboard (United States)

References

External links
 bonnieraitt.com: CD Info
 bonnieraitt.com: DVD Info

Bonnie Raitt live albums
Albums produced by Don Was
1995 live albums
Capitol Records live albums